Nettelnburg is a station on the Berlin-Hamburg railway line and served by the trains of Hamburg S-Bahn lines S2 and S21. The station was opened in 1970 and is located in the Hamburg suburb of Nettelnburg, Germany. Nettelnburg is part of the Hamburg borough of Bergedorf.

History  
The station was opened on 28 May 1970, after a major residential area of Nettelnburg north of the track had been built in the 1960s. From 1982 to 1994 the large residential area of Eastern Neuallermöhe south of the track was added, which is also connected by the station.

Service 
The lines S2 and S21 of Hamburg S-Bahn call at Nettelnburg station. The travel time to Hamburg Hauptbahnhof is about 18 minutes.

See also  

 Hamburger Verkehrsverbund (HVV)
 List of Hamburg S-Bahn stations

References

External links 

 Line and route network plans at hvv.de 

Hamburg S-Bahn stations in Hamburg
Buildings and structures in Bergedorf
Hamburg Netttelnburg
Hamburg Netttelnburg